Provincial Talagante is a Chilean Football club, their home town is Talagante, Chile. They currently play in the fourth level of Chilean football, the Tercera División.

The club were founded on February 03, 2006 and participated for 5 years in Tercera División and 1 year in Cuarta División.

Team 2016 
Actually 11/June/2016

Seasons played
5 seasons in Tercera División
1 season in Cuarta División

See also 
 Chilean football league system

Talagante
Talagante
2006 establishments in Chile